Chowlapally Pratap Reddy was elected as the Member of the Legislative Assembly for Shadnagar constituency in Andhra Pradesh, India, in 2009. He represented the Indian National Congress. After losing the 2014 and 2018 Assembly Elections miserably, he has quit the Indian National Congress and joined Telangana Rastra Samithi.

References

Andhra Pradesh MLAs 2009–2014
Indian National Congress politicians from Andhra Pradesh
Living people
Year of birth missing (living people)